Hans Grundberg (born 1977) is a Swedish diplomat and the current UN Special Envoy for Yemen since August 2021.

Biography 
Grundberg studied at the School of Economics in Stockholm and obtained a master's degree in economics. He served with both Swedish and European Union missions abroad, and posted to Cairo and Jerusalem, as well as Brussels, where he chaired the Middle East/Gulf Working Group of the European Council during the 2009 Swedish presidency of the European Union. In 2018 he headed the Gulf Division at the Swedish Ministry of Foreign Affairs in Stockholm during the time that Sweden hosted the United Nations-facilitated negotiations that culminated in the Stockholm Agreement. In 2019 Grundberg served as the EU's ambassador to Yemen before being appointed Special Envoy for Yemen in 2021. In 2022, he helped broker the first ceasefire during the Yemeni Civil War since 2016.

References 

1977 births
Ambassadors of the European Union to Yemen
UN Special Envoys for Yemen
Special Envoys of the Secretary-General of the United Nations
Special Representatives of the Secretary-General of the United Nations
Living people
Swedish officials of the United Nations
21st-century Swedish diplomats
Swedish officials of the European Union